The Sétif district is an Algerian administrative district in the Sétif province.  Its chief town is located on the eponymous town of Setif .

Communes 
The daira is composed of only one commune: Setif.

Localisation 
District borderings of the Sétif District are the communes of Guidjel and Ouled Sabor in Guidjel District, commune of Beni Fouda in  Djémila District, communes of El Ouricia, Ain Arnat, Mezloug in Ain Arnat District.

References 

Districts of Tizi Ouzou Province
Districts of Sétif Province